The Philippines participated in the 1974 Asian Games held in Tehran, Iran from September 1 to September 16, 1974. Ranked 15th with no gold medals, 2 silver medals and 11 bronze medals with a total of 13 over-all medals.

Asian Games performance
No gold medal. The country's production was only a pair of silvers by swimmer Gerardo "Ral" Rosario and 11 bronzes. Rosario placed second in both the 100-meter backstroke and 200-meter backstroke to become the only notable achiever in the country's worst performance ever in Asian Games history. The country sent 98 athletes and competed in 14 sports.

Medalists

The following Philippine competitors won medals at the Games.

Silver

Bronze

Multiple

Medal summary

Medal by sports

References

Nations at the 1974 Asian Games
1974
Asian Games